Barcelona City Hall is the seat of Barcelona City Council. It is situated in the Plaça Sant Jaume in the Gothic Quarter, opposite the Palau de la Generalitat de Catalunya housing the regional government.

The building maintains the Saló de Cent, where the Consell de Cent which governed the city met in the Middle Ages. The architect Arnau Bargués designed its Gothic facade, which was built between 1399 and 1402.

Josep Mas i Vila designed the current neoclassical facade, built between 1830 and 1847. When the church that is the namesake of the square was demolished in 1823, Mas was tasked with making a facade worthy of facing the Renaissance-era Generalitat building. The previous facade was to be sacrificed until a campaign by the Reial Acadèmia de Bones Lletres de Barcelona and the Reial Acadèmia Catalana de Belles Arts de Sant Jordi. The medieval door remains, with a notable mutilation.

In 2008, routine work on the city hall found Gothic and Renaissance paintings on the ceiling, underneath more modern paintings. In 2017, the council put €2.4 million towards the study and conservation of these paintings.

References

Bien de Interés Cultural landmarks in the Province of Barcelona
City and town halls in Spain
Buildings and structures in Barcelona
Gothic architecture in Barcelona
Neoclassical architecture in Barcelona